Scars of Love may refer to:
 Scars of Love (film), a 1918 Australian silent film
 Scars of Love (album), a 1987 album by TKA
 Scars of Love (song)